The Kaisei Academy (開成学園) is a preparatory private secondary school for boys located in the Arakawa ward of Tokyo, Japan. It was founded in 1871.

The Kaisei Academy has since educated notable figures across many different fields and is considered one of the most prestigious schools in the country. As of 2021, the school has had the most number of entrants to the University of Tokyo, which is regarded as the best university in Japan.

Overview 
Founded in 1871, the Kaisei Academy has produced a large number of notable alumni. Every year three hundred students are admitted to its junior high school, and one hundred students to its high school. The school's primary policy is 質実剛健 (Shitsu-jitsu-gou-ken), which means strong, simple, or spartan. The school policy is well represented in its school events such as an athletic meeting, marathon, swimming summer school, annual boat race with Senior High School at Otsuka, University of Tsukuba.

History
The school, which has produced hundreds of notable alumni, was founded in 1871. At first, it was established as the Kyōryū Gakkō as a preparatory school. After World War II, this school was integrated into the University of Tokyo. Its motto is "The pen is mightier than the sword", and is often known by the Japanese abbreviation "pen-ken" (pen-sword).

Notable alumni
 Okada Keisuke, (1868 – 1952) Prime Minister from 1934 to 1936 / Temporary on the register / In the prepschool age
 Ikeda Kikunae, (1864 – 1936) who identified the flavour umami / In the prepschool age
 Kogorō Takahira, (1854 - 1926) Japan's Ambassador to the United States from 1900 to 1909.
 Physicist Nagaoka Hantarō, (1865 – 1950)  who developed the Saturnian model of the atom / In the prepschool age
 Poet Masaoka Shiki, one of the "four great masters" of the haiku / In the prepschool age
 Poet and author Shimazaki Tōson (1872-1943), leading figure in the Meiji Romantic movement / In the prepschool age
 Admiral Akiyama Saneyuki (1868 – 1918), planner of the Japanese strategy at the Battle of Tsushima / In the prepschool age
 Vice Admiral Yamaguchi Tamon (1892 – June 4, 1942), commander of the aircraft carrier Hiryū at the Battle of Midway
 Mutō Toshirō (1934 – ), former Deputy Governor of the Bank of Japan.
 Fumio Kishida (1957 – ) Prime Minister from 2021.

References

External links
 Kaisei Academy
School profile

Educational institutions established in 1871
Private schools in Tokyo
Boys' schools in Japan
High schools in Tokyo
1871 establishments in Japan